Dozer Park, originally O'Brien Field and formerly Chiefs Stadium, is a baseball field located in downtown Peoria, Illinois.  It is the home of the Peoria Chiefs, the Midwest League affiliate of the St. Louis Cardinals; the Chiefs previously played at Meinen Field.  The college baseball team of Bradley University also uses the field. It opened on May 24, 2002.

History
Official groundbreaking ceremonies for the $23 million multi-purpose stadium took place on August 16, 2001.  The stadium opened on May 24, 2002 as O'Brien Field, with a game between the Chiefs and the Kane County Cougars.

O'Brien Auto Team held the original naming rights to the facility.

In 2011, the stadium hosted to the IHSA Class 1A and 2A baseball state finals. This was the first year the games were played at the facility.

In April 2013, the Chiefs, including the stadium, received $7.35 million in financing and debt forgiveness.  The plan included forgiveness of $1.2 million in debt to the City of Peoria; including $2 million in funding from Caterpillar Inc. for naming rights over 10 years; and $2.7 million in new investment of cash and equity by the Chiefs' ownership group of about 50.

On May 10, 2013, Caterpillar and the Chiefs announced that the stadium would be renamed "Dozer Park", a reference to Caterpillar bulldozers.

The field
The high concentration of sand naturally relieves soil compaction.

Running through the gravel are drainage tiles that run from home plate to center field. A huge sump pump beyond center field then drains into the city sewer system.

The makeup of the pitcher's mound and batter's boxes are almost 100% clay because it packs better and is wear resistant.  The rest of the infield skin area is around 40% clay, 30% silt and 20% sand.

It takes 1.25 hours to cut the outfield grass 2 directions with a  cut mower. A walk-behind mower is used for the infield.

The price tag for the field itself was around $450,000.

Luxury suites
Dozer Park accommodates 20 luxury suites. Examples include:
 Peoria attorney Jay Janssen's suite — "A large, ornate Oriental rug covers most of the green-carpeted suite, which includes six candelabra wall sconces, a chandelier in the center, cherry wood cabinetry and chair rail, decorative border print, a green marble-topped table, a rose-colored granite pedestal bar overlooking the field and burgundy leather stools and chairs. In the kitchenette, a full-sized refrigerator is accompanied by a full-size oven and a sink with a chrome-plated faucet."
 Caterpillar, Inc. owns a double suite that is primarily used to entertain the customers and VIP guests the company hosts in the community.

Food
Other than the five fixed concession stands, there are mobile carts around the park.  The Chiefs' concessionaire is Professional Sports Catering.

See also
 List of NCAA Division I baseball venues

References

External links
 Ballpark - Peoria Chiefs Dozer Park
 Dozer Park - Bradley University Athletics

Bradley Braves baseball
Baseball venues in Illinois
College baseball venues in the United States
Minor league baseball venues
Sports venues in Peoria, Illinois
Buildings and structures in Peoria, Illinois
Tourist attractions in Peoria, Illinois
Sports venues completed in 2002
2002 establishments in Illinois
Midwest League ballparks